Sebastián Javier Britos Rodríguez (born January 2, 1988 in Minas) is a Uruguayan footballer currently playing as a goalkeeper for Atlante FC of the Ascenso MX.

Career statistics

Club

Notes

References

1988 births
Living people
Uruguayan footballers
Uruguayan expatriate footballers
Association football midfielders
Uruguayan Primera División players
Uruguayan Segunda División players
Bolivian Primera División players
Categoría Primera A players
Ascenso MX players
C.A. Bella Vista players
Montevideo Wanderers F.C. players
Liverpool F.C. (Montevideo) players
Cortuluá footballers
C.A. Cerro players
Oriente Petrolero players
El Tanque Sisley players
Atlante F.C. footballers
Uruguayan expatriate sportspeople in Bolivia
Uruguayan expatriate sportspeople in Colombia
Uruguayan expatriate sportspeople in Mexico
Expatriate footballers in Bolivia
Expatriate footballers in Colombia
Expatriate footballers in Mexico